The National Wales was a Welsh daily news website owned by Newsquest and compact newspaper. Gavin Thompson is the editor, while three journalists – audience and content editor Michael Sweet and reporter Gareth Axenderrie – have been taken on to work for the title; Rachel Nurse, another reporter, died in October 2021. Unlike the Scottish outlet of the same name, The National took no political stance and claimed to simply be "pro-Wales". It became a weekly newspaper from 17 April 2021, but ceased print in November of that year. Its closure was announced in August 2022, and the website has since been taken offline.

History
The National was founded by Huw Marshall, who wanted to "challenge the dominant incumbents who provide news from a UK perspective". Thompson said the media landscape in Wales struggled to match that of Scotland, where the public have the choice between several national newspaper titles as well as Scottish editions of UK papers. He said, "Wales doesn't really have that in the same way and we really feel it should. It's really been very stark during the Covid pandemic where a large number of people take their news from sources that are writing it from an English perspective."

The National launched three days after another Welsh news website, Herald.Wales.

Within three weeks of launching, The National had 430 paid-up subscribers and announced a target of 1,000. Thompson stated that if the paper reached this target, a full-time political correspondent would be hired.

The newspaper began being published weekly from 14 April 2021, but on 13 November 2021, editor Gavin Thompson announced that, after just seven months, the newspaper would cease to be published in print form, but would continue as a website.

It was announced on 25 August 2022 that The National would close down due to declining subscriptions as a result of the economic crisis. Thompson announced the paper's closure on 31 August. The website is no longer operational.

Reception
Kevin Ward, the former editor of the South Wales Argus, called The National "a good read, providing you have an interest in Wales and politics". In his review of the paper, he urged it to take an explicitly pro-Welsh independence editorial stance in order to exploit a "real gap in the Welsh media market". He added, "I'll watch its progress with interest, but I can't help but wonder whether the real gap in the Welsh media market – a niche identified by Newsquest some years ago with daily newspaper The National in Scotland – is for a national title that supports Welsh independence, particularly as the cross-party YesCymru movement has seen such a surge of interest in recent months."

See also
 List of newspapers in Wales
 List of newspapers by date

References

External links
 
 Newsquest

2021 establishments in Wales
21st century in Wales
Mass media in Wales
Newspapers published in Wales
Newspapers with Scottish Gaelic content
Publications established in 2021
Welsh brands
Newspapers published by Newsquest
Welsh websites